Rozeboom is a Dutch toponymic surname meaning "rose tree". The variant spellings Rooseboom, Roosenboom, Rosenboom, Roozeboom, Roseboom, Rozeboom, and Rozenboom are pronounced similarly in Dutch. People with these surnames include:

Christian Rozeboom (born 1997), American football player
Daniel Rooseboom de Vries (born 1980), Dutch freestyle footballer 
David Rosenboom (born 1947), American composer
Hendrik Willem Bakhuis Roozeboom (1854–1907), Dutch physical chemist
Ken Rozenboom (born 1951), American (Iowa) Republican politician
Lance Rozeboom (born 1989), American soccer player
Margaretha Roosenboom (1843–1896), Dutch flower painter, daughter of Nicolaas
Nicolaas Johannes Roosenboom (1805–1880), Dutch landscape painter and printmaker
Teddy Roseboom (1896–1980), English football forward
Thomas Rosenboom (born 1956), Dutch novelist and short story author
Willem Rooseboom (1843–1920), Dutch Major General of the Dutch East Indies 1899–1904

See also
SS Rooseboom, a Dutch steam ship named after Willem Rooseboom that was sunk by the Japanese near Sumatra in 1942
Rosenbaum, cognate German and Yiddish surname

References

Dutch-language surnames
Toponymic surnames